The 1999 Miller Lite 225 was the seventh round of the 1999 CART FedEx Champ Car World Series season, held on June 6, 1999, on the Milwaukee Mile in West Allis, Wisconsin.

Report

Race 
After taking his first career pole, Hélio Castro-Neves led the early stages of the race but he then began to slow due to a boost failure and dropped back down the field and eventually retired. The lead went to Jimmy Vasser, but when he got stuck up behind traffic, he was passed by Dario Franchitti. Michael Andretti was charging up through the field and soon took the lead for himself, until he ran over a crew member at the first round of pit stops. The crew member suffered minor injuries, but Andretti lost two laps in getting his car restarted, and another lap due to the black flag. With Franchitti also penalized for running over an air hose and being sent to the back of the cars on the lead lap, Paul Tracy led, but before the stint was over, the Ganassi cars of Vasser and Juan Pablo Montoya both passed him. Montoya jumped Vasser at the next round of stops. They dominated most of the race after that, but Montoya had to pit for fuel with 15 laps left, and Vasser had to do the same 4 laps later. Tracy, helped by a caution period, was able to stretch his fuel and win ahead of Greg Moore, who was also able to do the same, and Gil de Ferran.

Classification

Race 

Notes
 – Patrick Carpentier and Juan Pablo Montoya were both penalized one lap for passing under yellow. This demoted Carpentier from 4th to 9th and Montoya from 6th to 10th.

Caution flags

Lap Leaders

Point standings after race

References

1999 in CART
Milwaukee Indy 225